Little Armenia is a neighborhood in Central Los Angeles, California.  It is named after the Armenians who escaped genocide and made their way to Los Angeles during the early part of the 20th century.

The area is served by the Metro B Line at the Hollywood/Western, Vermont/Sunset and Vermont/Santa Monica stations.

History 

The context behind early ethnic-Armenian immigration to Hollywood and the surrounding areas was due to political strife abroad. Some immigrants came from Romania fleeing the Ceaușescu regime, from Lebanon due to the Lebanese Civil War, from Soviet Armenia inadvertently as a result of US's Jackson-Vanik amendment, from Iran as a result of the Iranian revolution as well as from other countries like Syria, Turkey and other countries.

In 1999, the Honorary Mayor of Little Armenia, Garbis Keurjikian, also known as Garo, had a vision to establish an area in East Hollywood representing the Armenians who migrated to America. He worked with Councilwoman Jackie Goldberg to bring his vision to life. After working on the establishment of Little Armenia for a year, the ceremony opening took place on October 6, 2000, outside of Saint Garabed Armenian Apostolic Church. The name comes from the large number of Armenian-Americans who live in the area, and also  from the large number of Armenian stores and businesses that had already opened in the neighborhood by the early 1970s.

St. Garabed Armenian Apostolic Church is an Armenian church that is located inside Little Armenia. St. Garabed church is the place of worship for the vast majority of Armenians living in Hollywood. It is located on Alexandria Avenue and it was built in 1978. The church is located in front of the Rose and Alex Pilibos Armenian School.

Many of the novels, short stories and poems of Charles Bukowski, a native of East Hollywood, are set in the area.

On April 24 each year, Armenians gather in Hollywood to commemorate the Armenian genocide. Though Hollywood was once home to the biggest Armenian community in the region, Glendale surpassed Hollywood in both the total number and proportion of Armenians in population, while Burbank, Pasadena, Montebello, and La Crescenta also have large Armenian communities but with no special designation.

Geography

On October 6, 2000, the Los Angeles City Council designated a portion of East Hollywood as “Little Armenia” in an effort to recognize the community’s vast “presence and voice in Los Angeles.”

As defined by the City Council, Little Armenia is "the area bounded on the north by Hollywood Boulevard between the 101 Freeway and Vermont Avenue, on the east by Vermont Avenue from Hollywood Boulevard to Santa Monica Boulevard, on the south by Santa Monica Boulevard between Vermont Avenue and U.S. Route 101 and on the west by Route 101 from Santa Monica Boulevard to Hollywood Boulevard".

Thai Town is located to the north of Little Armenia.

Transportation

Little Armenia is served by the Metro B Line subway, which runs north-south along Vermont Avenue and east-west along Hollywood Boulevard.

Metro subway stations include:
Vermont/Santa Monica
Vermont/Sunset
Hollywood/Western

Numerous bus lines run on the major thoroughfares, including Metro's Rapid and Local service lines. Los Angeles Department of Transportation's DASH shuttle lines, serving East Hollywood, Hollywood, and the Griffith Observatory, also operate in the area.

Parks and recreation 
Parks within Little Armenia's official borders are the following:
 Barnsdall Art Park -  4800 Hollywood Boulevard.  The park includes the Frank Lloyd Wright designed Hollyhock House and a city-run arts center built in 1919-1921.

Education

Schools within Little Armenia's official borders are the following:

Public
 Kingsley Elementary School, 5200 West Virginia Avenue
 Ramona Elementary School, 1133 North Mariposa Avenue

Private

 Alex Pilibos Armenian School, K-12, 1625 North Alexandria Avenue

Notable places
Places of interest within Little Armenia's official borders include the following:
 The intersection of Hollywood Boulevard and Western Avenue was designated as Armenian Genocide Memorial Square on April 24, 2015 to commemorate the 100th anniversary of the Armenian genocide. It was proposed by Los Angeles City Council members Mitch O'Farrell and Paul Krekorian and approved by the Los Angeles City Council on March 18, 2015.

 The Church of Scientology Los Angeles headquarters. Located on Sunset Bl. between N. Catalina St. and L. Ron Hubbard Way.  
 Hollyhock House  
 Hollywood & Western Building
 Zankou Chicken's first American restaurant

See also

 Armenian Americans
 History of Armenian Americans in Los Angeles
 List of Armenian-Americans
 Armenian Diaspora
 Armenian Assembly of America
 Armenian American Political Action Committee
 Armenian National Committee of America
 Armenian Youth Federation
 Little Armenia, New York

References

External links

LittleArmenia.com: Community-based website.
Little Armenia Video Tour

Armenian-American culture in Los Angeles
Armenian-American culture in California
Armenian diaspora communities in the United States
Ethnic enclaves in California
Neighborhoods in Los Angeles
East Hollywood, Los Angeles